The Judith Landing Historic District is a historic district near Winifred, Montana which was listed on the National Register of Historic Places in 1975.  It is large,  in size, spanning parts of Choteau and Fergus counties, including the confluences of the Judith River and Dog Creek into the Missouri River.

It includes the Hayden Site, site in 1855 of the first discovery of dinosaur skeletal remains in the Western hemisphere.

The district was expanded in 2014 in a boundary increase NRHP listing.  It includes archeological sites and was listed for its information potential.

It is along the Missouri River and includes a Corps of Discovery campsite of May 28, 1805 of the Lewis and Clark expedition.

It is a historic site managed by BLM; extends into Fergus County. Boundary increase on 2014-04-11.

The listing included eight contributing buildings, 37 contributing sites, and a contributing object.

"The Judith Landing Historic District includes the beautiful, rugged landscape of dry high bluffs, intermittent creeks, and verdant bottomlands along the Missouri River at the mouths of the Judith River and Dog Creek.  The district established in 1975 embraces a 15-square mile area and includes property in both Fergus and Chouteau Counties.  The boundary increase area addressed in this nomination lies within Fergus County, and abuts the southeastern side of the original district, including a portion of the Dog Creek drainage and breaks encompassing the site where Ferdinand Hayden uncovered and collected several specimens of fossilized dinosaur bones and teeth in 1855.  Hayden’s discoveries constituted the first identified dinosaur skeletal remains in the Western Hemisphere.  Subsequent paleontological expeditions, including the 1875 Army Corps of Engineers Expedition led by Col. William Ludlow with George Bird Grinnell and Edward S. Dana, the 1876 Edward Drinker Cope expedition, and Charles H. Sternberg’s 1914 trek, also explored the fossil beds in the Dog Creek Drainage first discovered by Hayden."

Historic function: Domestic; Transportation; Landscape; Funerary; Defense; Agriculture/subsistence
Historic subfunction: Single Dwelling; Fortification; Camp; Graves/burials
Criteria: event, event, architecture/engineering, architecture/engineering, person, person, information potential, information potential

"A recreation area located between Winifred and Big Sandy, Montana today, this place has a long history of early exploration. It was placed on the National Register of Historic Places as a Historic District in 1975. Among the many events identified within this Historic District are a Corps of Discovery campsite, May 28, 1805; Fort Chardon Trading Post, 1844–1845; Isaac Stevens 1855 Lame Bull Treaty; Camp Cooke (first military post in Montana), 1866–1870; PN Cable Ferry, 1880–1908. On the south side of the river at Judith Landing, the entire river bottom was once part of a large, open-range cattle spread founded by T.C. Power, merchant prince of Fort Benton, and John Norris, who managed the ranch for the company. Today, the recreation area provides a campground and is a common take-out point for many boaters along the Missouri River."

There is a Judith Landing Recreation Area in Montana.

References

External links

Historic districts on the National Register of Historic Places in Montana
Archaeological sites in Montana
National Register of Historic Places in Chouteau County, Montana
National Register of Historic Places in Fergus County, Montana
Buildings and structures completed in 1805
Paleontological sites of North America
Lewis and Clark Expedition